Steven Arnold Majiedt (born 18 December 1960) is a judge of the Constitutional Court of South Africa and formerly served on the country's Supreme Court of Appeal and as an acting judge on the Constitutional Court. He is best known for his judgment in National Commissioner of the SAPS v Southern Africa Litigation Centre, which pioneered universal jurisdiction and was a focal precedent in the scandal over the South African government's failure, in violation of an ICC arrest warrant and domestic court order, to arrest Omar al-Bashir.

Early life and education

Majiedt was born in Kenhardt and matriculated in 1978 at the William Pescod High School in Kimberley.  He obtained a BA (Law) degree in 1981 followed by an LLB in 1983, both from the University of the Western Cape.

Career

In 1984, Majiedt joined the Cape Bar and in the same year that he began practicing as an advocate, he was awarded the Fulbright Scholarship to complete an LLM at Stanford University. He however declined the offer.

From 1997 until 1999, Majiedt joined the Northern Cape Premier’s Office as the Chief State Law Advisor. He then returned to practice as an advocate at the Northern Cape Bar, and in 2000, he was appointed as a judge in the Northern Cape High Court. Ten years later, in 2010, he was appointed to the Supreme Court of Appeal and on 11 September 2019, Majiedt was appointed by the President Cyril Ramaphosa, to the Constitutional Court.

References

1960 births
Living people
Judges of the Constitutional Court of South Africa
South African judges